The 1975 Boston College Eagles football team represented Boston College as an independent during the 1975 NCAA Division I football season. In its eighth season under head coach Joe Yukica, the team compiled a 7–4 record and outscored opponents by a total of 227 to 146. 

The team's statistical leaders included Mike Kruczek with 1,132 passing yards, Keith Barnette with 958 rushing yards, and Mike Godbolt with 354 receiving yards. 

The team played its home games at Alumni Stadium in Chestnut Hill, Massachusetts.

Schedule

Roster

References

Boston College
Boston College Eagles football seasons
Boston College Eagles football
Boston College Eagles football